A Hamiltonian system is a dynamical system governed by Hamilton's equations. In physics, this dynamical system describes the evolution of a physical system such as a planetary system or an electron in an electromagnetic field. These systems can be studied in both Hamiltonian mechanics and dynamical systems theory.

Overview 

Informally, a Hamiltonian system is a mathematical formalism developed by Hamilton to describe the evolution equations of a physical system. The advantage of this description is that it gives important insights into the dynamics, even if the initial value problem cannot be solved analytically. One example is the planetary movement of three bodies: while there is no closed-form solution to the general problem, Poincaré showed for the first time that it exhibits deterministic chaos.

Formally, a Hamiltonian system is a dynamical system characterised by the scalar function , also known as the Hamiltonian.

and the evolution equations are given by Hamilton's equations:

The trajectory  is the solution of the initial value problem defined by Hamilton's equations and the initial condition .

Time-independent Hamiltonian systems

If the Hamiltonian is not explicitly time-dependent, i.e. if , then the Hamiltonian does not vary with time at all:

and thus the Hamiltonian is a constant of motion, whose constant equals the total energy of the system: . Examples of such systems are the undamped pendulum, the harmonic oscillator, and dynamical billiards.

Example

An example of a time-independent Hamiltonian system is the harmonic oscillator. Then the Hamiltonian is given by

 

The Hamiltonian of this system does not depend on time and thus the energy of the system is conserved.

Symplectic structure 
One important property of a Hamiltonian dynamical system is that it has a symplectic structure. Writing

 

the evolution equation of the dynamical system can be written as

where

and IN is the N×N identity matrix.

One important consequence of this property is that an infinitesimal phase-space volume is preserved. A corollary of this is Liouville's theorem, which states that on a Hamiltonian system, the phase-space volume of a closed surface is preserved under time evolution.

where the third equality comes from the divergence theorem.

Examples
Dynamical billiards
Planetary systems, more specifically, the n-body problem.
Canonical general relativity

See also
 Action-angle coordinates
 Liouville's theorem
 Integrable system
 Symplectic manifold
 Kolmogorov–Arnold–Moser theorem

References

Further reading
 Almeida, A. M. (1992). Hamiltonian systems: Chaos and quantization. Cambridge monographs on mathematical physics. Cambridge (u.a.: Cambridge Univ. Press)
 Audin, M., (2008). Hamiltonian systems and their integrability. Providence, R.I: American Mathematical Society, 
 Dickey, L. A.  (2003). Soliton equations and Hamiltonian systems. Advanced series in mathematical physics, v. 26. River Edge, NJ: World Scientific.
Treschev, D., & Zubelevich, O. (2010). Introduction to the perturbation theory of Hamiltonian systems. Heidelberg: Springer
Zaslavsky, G. M. (2007). The physics of chaos in Hamiltonian systems. London: Imperial College Press.

External links
 

Hamiltonian mechanics